Tsing Yi North Bridge, also called Tsing Tsuen Bridge, connects the Tam Kon Shan Interchange on Tsing Yi Island to the Tsuen Tsing Interchange in Tsuen Wan, spanning the Rambler Channel. Inaugurated on 10 December 1987, the bridge was designed to improve access to Tsing Yi, which at that time was connected to Kwai Chung by only one fixed link, the heavily congested Tsing Yi Bridge.

History
The Tsing Yi North Bridge was intended to alleviate congestion on Tsing Yi's sole existing bridge to the south. It was designed by Scott Wilson Kirkpatrick and Partners and constructed by the Maeda/Oriental Joint Venture. Construction began on 24 September 1984.

An opening ceremony for the Tsing Yi North Bridge, built at a cost of HK$200 million, was held by Governor David Wilson on 10 December 1987. It opened to traffic on 11 December 1987, at which time it was the longest bridge in Hong Kong.

The ferry service between Tsing Yi and Tsuen Wan was terminated by Hongkong and Yaumati Ferry several years after the opening of the North Bridge.

Structure
Tsing Yi North Bridge was, when opened in 1987, Hong Kong's largest prestressed balanced cantilever bridge with a main navigation span of 160 metres, side spans of 90 metres, and approach viaducts that brought the total length to 1,015 metres. The design can support a 2-way and 4-lane traffic. The balustrade on the bridge was an aluminium-type to prevent rusting, although it was changed to welded stainless steel, because of the frequent stolen cases of aluminium bars in the past decades.

Extension
On 1 February 2002, the day of the opening of Tsing Yi North Coastal Road, the North Bridge was connected and became the main path from Tsuen Wan to Tung Chung on Lantau Island and the International Airport in Chek Lap Kok.

References

Tsing Yi
Bridges in Hong Kong
Tsuen Wan
Bridges completed in 1987
1987 establishments in Hong Kong
Extra areas operated by NT taxis
Roads in the New Territories